Colin Lawrence is a British-born Canadian actor known for his roles in film and television.

Early life 
Lawrence was born in London and raised in Vancouver, British Columbia, Canada. He is of Jamaican descent.

Career 
Since 1994, he has participated in many TV series, either as guest star or in recurring roles.

From 2006 to 2009, he gained recognition as Hamish "Skulls" McCall on the rebooted Battlestar Galactica TV series. In the TV series Blade (2006) he was the protagonist's father. In the TV series Endgame (2011) he appeared as detective Jason Evans. In 2011 and 2012, he appeared in 12 episodes as Benjamin Abani on The Killing.  More recently, he has appeared in recurring roles as Janko in The CW series iZombie, as Damien in the TV Land sitcom Impastor, and as Coach Clayton in The CW series Riverdale. Since 2019, He has played the main character John "Preacher" Middleton in the Netflix series Virgin River.

Besides his career as a TV actor he also appeared in many feature films, including Afghan Knights and Watchmen.

Filmography

Film

Television

References

External links
 

English male television actors
English male film actors
Living people
Canadian people of Jamaican descent
Year of birth missing (living people)